Antonio Torres may refer to:

 Antônio Torres, Brazilian writer.
 António Torres (rower), Portuguese rower
 Antonio Alberto Torres (born 1994), Mexican footballer
 Antonio de Torres Jurado (1817–1892), Spanish guitarist and luthier
 Antonio Torres Pérez (born 1945), Puerto Rican comedian
 Antonio Torres (Sunset Beach), a character from the US soap opera Sunset Beach
 Antoni Torres (1943–2003), Spanish footballer
Antonio C. Torres, Founder of the Order of the Knights of Rizal